Paampuranathar Temple, Thirupampuram is situated at Thirupampuram in Thiruvarur district in the Indian state of Tamil Nadu.

Significance 
It is one of the shrines of the 275 Paadal Petra Sthalams - Shiva Sthalams glorified in the early medieval Tevaram poems by Tamil Saivite Nayanar Tirugnanasambandar  Sundarar  and Appar.

Pooja's

Pooja's for Rahu ketu doshas is done here.  In order to get relieved from Nagadosham, people who do not have children and for Raghu-Kethu Dosham people come here and offer prayers to the lord.

As per Hindu belief, people troubled by Sarpa-dosha or Malefic effects Rahu-Kethu seek a relief by offering prayers in a single day to Kudanthai or Kumbakonam Nageshwarar in the morning, Thirunageshwaram Naganathar at the noon, Thirupamburam Pambureswarar in the evening and Nagoor Nageshwarar or Naganathar temple at night.

References

Shiva temples in Tiruvarur district
Padal Petra Stalam